Platoro Dam (National ID # CO82911) is a dam in Conejos County, Colorado.

It impounds the Conejos River, a tributary of the Rio Grande, for irrigation water storage as part of the larger San Luis Valley Project. The dam is owned by the Bureau and operated by the local Conejos Water Conservancy.

Recreation includes fishing, camping, boating and hunting, although use is light because of the remote, high mountain valley location and the short season.

See also
List of Rio Grande dams and diversions
List of largest reservoirs of Colorado

References 

Dams in Colorado
Reservoirs in Colorado
United States Bureau of Reclamation dams
Dams completed in 1951
Buildings and structures in Conejos County, Colorado
Dams in the Rio Grande basin
Bodies of water of Conejos County, Colorado
1951 establishments in Colorado